Barford St Michael is a village on the south bank of the River Swere in Oxfordshire, England, about  south of Banbury.

History

The village is part of the civil parish of Barford St. John and St. Michael. Barford St Michael has sometimes been called Great Barford as it is much larger than the village of Barford St. John on the opposite bank of the Swere.  The bell tower and north doorway of Church of England parish church of St Michael are Norman. Much of the rest of the church was rebuilt in the 13th century in the Early English Gothic style. It is a Grade I listed building.  In August 1549 the vicar, James Webbe, was executed at Aylesbury for his part in leading a rising in protest at the abolition of the Latin liturgy and other religious reforms.  The village has one public house, the George Inn. It was built in 1697 and in the 20th century was a Hunt Edmunds tied house. There is also a farm shop. Woodworm Records Recording Studio is based in the village.

References

External links

 

Villages in Oxfordshire